Delon Felix (born 20 June 1974) is a Grenadian sprinter. He competed in the men's 400 metres at the 1992 Summer Olympics.

Achievements

References

External links
 

1974 births
Living people
Athletes (track and field) at the 1992 Summer Olympics
Athletes (track and field) at the 1995 Pan American Games
Grenadian male sprinters
Olympic athletes of Grenada
Place of birth missing (living people)
Pan American Games competitors for Grenada